Kaabour is a surname. Notable people with the surname include:

Ahmad Kaabour (born 1955), Lebanese singer, composer, and actor
Mahmoud Kaabour (born 1979), Lebanese filmmaker, writer, and public speaker